Primary Airport Control Station, or PACS, is a survey marker established in the vicinity of an airport and tied directly to the National Spatial Reference System. This control consists of permanent marks with precisely determined latitudes, longitudes and elevations. PACS and SACS are designated by the National Geodetic Survey and must meet the specific siting, construction, and accuracy requirements. (also see airport security)

PACS coordinates are established by meeting a survey, data processing, adjustment and reporting standard known as the NGS Bluebook. (See Aviation safety for more info)

External links
 The NGS complete list of airports with PACS and SACS
 Input Formats and Specifications of the National Geodetic Survey Data Base
 PACS and SACS overview with diagrams

Surveying
Airport infrastructure